Tony Pounder (born 11 March 1966) is a former professional footballer, who played in The Football League for Bristol Rovers and Hereford United.

He started playing for Westland Sports, when he was spotted by Weymouth. He then joined Bristol Rovers, Hereford United and Yeovil Town.

References

1966 births
Living people
People from Yeovil
English footballers
Association football midfielders
Westland Sports F.C. players
Weymouth F.C. players
Bristol Rovers F.C. players
Hereford United F.C. players
Yeovil Town F.C. players
Frome Town F.C. players
English Football League players